Margaret Smith and Lesley Turner were the defending champions, but lost in the third round to Françoise Dürr and Janine Lieffrig.

Maria Bueno and Billie Jean Moffitt defeated Dürr and Lieffrig in the final, 6–2, 7–5 to win the ladies' doubles tennis title at the 1965 Wimbledon Championships.

Seeds

  Margaret Smith /  Lesley Turner (third round)
  Maria Bueno /  Billie Jean Moffitt (champions)
  Carole Graebner /  Nancy Richey (semifinals)
 n/a

Draw

Finals

Top half

Section 1

Section 2

Bottom half

Section 3

Section 4

References

External links

Women's Doubles
Wimbledon Championship by year – Women's doubles
Wimbledon Championships
Wimbledon Championships